Harlow is a 1965 American biographical drama film directed by Gordon Douglas about the life of film star Jean Harlow. It stars Carroll Baker in the titular role and Raf Vallone, Red Buttons, Angela Lansbury, Peter Lawford, Mike Connors, Martin Balsam and Leslie Nielsen in supporting roles. The picture was released by Paramount Pictures shortly after Magna had released a different film with the same title and subject. Although the film failed commercially, it was successful in launching the hit song "Girl Talk" by Neal Hefti.

Plot
The film opens with Harlow as a struggling extra and bit actress supporting a greedy stepfather Marino and a loving but oblivious mother "Mama Jean". With the help of agent Arthur Landau, she secures a contract at the studio of the Howard Hughes-inspired Richard Manley. The reception to her first film is disappointing, and at Manley's studio her career is stalled. When Manley attempts to add her to his list of seduced starlets, Harlow fights him off and tells him what she thinks of him. This scene turns out to be a ruse devised by her agent so that the now-furious Manley terminates her contract. Landau successfully pitches Harlow to Majestic Studios, and her career blossoms. Despite studio encouragement to marry another contract star, Harlow marries the apparently gentle and cultured Paul Bern, who is revealed to be impotent. Soon after, Bern commits suicide. His death, combined with the stress of her career, leads Harlow on an odyssey of failed relationships and alcoholism, culminating in her death of kidney failure at the age of 26.

Cast
Carroll Baker as Jean Harlow
Red Buttons as Arthur Landau
Raf Vallone as Marino Bello
Angela Lansbury as Mama Jean Bello
Peter Lawford as Paul Bern
Mike Connors as Jack Harrison (as Michael Connors)
Martin Balsam as Everett Redman
Leslie Nielsen as Richard Manley
Mary Murphy as Sally Doane
Hanna Landy as Beatrice Landau
Peter Hansen as Assistant Director
Kipp Hamilton as Marie Tanner
Peter Leeds as Parker
Sonny Liston as a fist fighter

Production
The concept of depicting Jean Harlow on film had originated in the 1950s. Many actresses were reported to have been cast as Harlow in different biopics, such as Cleo Moore for Columbia and Jayne Mansfield for Fox, but both of these projects fell through. In 1962, Fox announced that Marilyn Monroe would play Harlow in a lavish biopic under her new contract. However, after Monroe's death, the project was sold to Paramount, which cast Carroll Baker in the title role.  Based in part on Irving Shulman's pulp biography Harlow: An Intimate Biography, Paramount's Harlow is a melodramatic look at Harlow's life, focusing on her failed marriages.  The widescreen Technicolor film, produced by Joseph E. Levine, was made on a $2.5 million budget, and was supported by a wide-reaching publicity campaign. The previous year, Carroll Baker had played a fictionalized version of Harlow dubbed "Rina Marlowe" in the smash-hit film The Carpetbaggers starring George Peppard and Alan Ladd, which had also been produced by Joseph E. Levine.

Director Gordon Douglas later said that during filming Baker "was very sick, physically and also mentally, I think. She was going through bad times. But she did a hell of a good job on the picture."

Home media
On September 28, 2010, Olive Films released Harlow on Region 1 DVD in the United States.

See also
List of American films of 1965

References

External links

 
 
 

1965 films
1965 drama films
American biographical films
Biographical films about actors
Films based on biographies
Films directed by Gordon Douglas
Films scored by Neal Hefti
Films set in the 1920s
Films set in the 1930s
Films set in Los Angeles
Embassy Pictures films
Paramount Pictures films
Films with screenplays by John Michael Hayes
1960s English-language films
1960s American films